Björn Axel Åke Malcolm Hamilton (born March 28, 1945) is a Swedish count, engineer and politician. He has been a member of the Swedish parliament for the Moderate Party since 2002, serving as a member of the Riksdag for Stockholm County from 2002 to 2010.

Early life and career 
Hamilton was born in Gothenburg on March 28, 1945, the son of Björn Hamilton and Barbro Pauli. Hamilton's paternal grandfather is physician Axel Hamilton. Hamilton graduated from Lund University in 1970, before gaining a Master of Science degree from the University of California, Berkeley in 1973. He subsequently worked as a consultant at Kjessler & Mannerstråle and Scandiaconsult, and was a business area manager for Statens Järnväger from 1984 until 1992.

Political career 
Between 1992 and 2002, Hamilton was chairman of the municipal council of Danderyd, Stockholm County. In 2002 he was elected as a member of the Riksdag for Stockholm County. During his tenure, he served as a member of the committees for transport (2003-2006), foreign affairs (2006-2007), the EU (2006–10) and nutrition (2007-2010). For several months in 2006 and 2007 he served as chairman of the EU committee following Göran Lennmarker's promotion to chairman of the foreign affairs committee.

Hamilton is currently the chairman of the Danderyd municipal council.

References 

 

1945 births
Living people
Members of the Riksdag from the Moderate Party
Swedish counts
Swedish people of Scottish descent
Swedish engineers
Members of the Riksdag 2002–2006